Corning is an unincorporated community in Freeborn and  Mower Counties, Minnesota, United States.

Notes

Unincorporated communities in Freeborn County, Minnesota
Unincorporated communities in Mower County, Minnesota
Unincorporated communities in Minnesota